Popovici (son of a priest)  is a Romanian/Moldovan surname:

 Alexandru Popovici (Moldovan footballer) (born 1977), Moldovan footballer
 Alexandru Adrian Popovici (born 1988), Romanian footballer
 Aurel Popovici (1863–1917), Austro-Hungarian ethnic Romanian lawyer and politician
 Constantin Popovici (born 1988), Romanian diver
 David Popovici (born 2004), Romanian swimmer
 Dorin Popovici (born 1996), Moldovan footballer
 Doru Popovici (born 1932), Romanian composer
 Dumitru Popovici (1902–1952), Romanian literary historian
 Dumitru Popovici (footballer), (born 1983), Moldovan footballer
 Fred Popovici, (born 1948), Romanian composer
 George Popovici (1863–1905), poet and politician
 Gheorghe Popovici (1859–1933), painter
 Ioan Popovici (brigadier general) (1865–1953), Romanian general
 Ioan Popovici (divisional general) (1857–1956), Romanian general
 Ioan Popovici-Bănățeanul (1869–1893), Austro-Hungarian and Romanian writer
 Traian Popovici (1892–1946), Romanian lawyer and mayor of Cernăuți

See also
 Popov
 Popović

Romanian-language surnames

he:פופוביץ'